Frédéric Guesdon (born October 14, 1971) is a French former professional road bicycle racer who competed as a professional between 1995 and 2012, most notably for UCI ProTeam , spending 16 years of his career with the team.

Guesdon was born in Saint-Méen-le-Grand, Brittany. He turned professional in 1995 with the French Le Groupement team and moved on to the Polti team in 1996, where he scored eleventh place at Paris–Roubaix and third place at the French championship. Guesdon had his breakthrough year in 1997. Having signed with the new Française des Jeux team, he scored an early victory for the team in the prestigious spring monument Paris–Roubaix. On the day,  of his 1997 Paris–Roubaix victory, he persuaded his team director Marc Madiot to designate him a protected rider alongside his team leader Max Sciandri. After a race full of punctures,  Guesdon was with the leading group, containing the defending champion Johan Museeuw, when they entered the velodrome  and attacked early to win. Later he would put his race winning move down to inexperience. Guesdon also took victories at the Classic Haribo and a stage in the Tour du Limousin. Guesdon had to wait until 2000 for his next major victory, a stage in the Critérium du Dauphiné Libéré, a feat he repeated in 2002. Despite a complete lack of victories between this win and his next win, over three-and-a-half years later in the 2006 Tropicale Amissa Bongo, Guesdon remained loyal to Française des Jeux and Française des Jeux to him. This paid dividends when Guesdon won the 2006 UCI ProTour race Paris–Tours, his first ProTour victory and the first overall ProTour victory both for Française des Jeux since the inception of the competition in 2005. Following this result he would serve as a guide to new young team recruits.

In 1998 Madiot opined that Guesdon "[was] not a great rider, but he will have some great rides".

A hip injury at the 2012 Tour Down Under provided him with determination to recover for his swansong.  He retired on 8 April 2012, after completing Paris–Roubaix.

Major results

1996
 3rd Road race, National Road Championships
 6th Grand Prix d'Ouverture La Marseillaise
1997
 1st Paris–Roubaix
 1st Classic Haribo
 1st Stage 2 Tour du Limousin
 2nd Polynormande
1998
 5th Grand Prix de Denain
 6th Overall Tour du Limousin
1999
 1st Stage 3 Tour de l'Ain
 3rd Grand Prix d'Isbergues
2000
 1st Stage 1 Critérium du Dauphiné Libéré
 1st Stage 1 Giro della Provincia di Lucca
 3rd Grand Prix d'Isbergues
 8th Dwars door Vlaanderen
2001
 1st  Mountains classification Tour Méditerranéen
 3rd Grand Prix de Denain
 8th Tro-Bro Léon
2002
 1st Stage 5 Critérium du Dauphiné Libéré
 4th Overall Étoile de Bessèges
2003
 5th E3 Prijs Vlaanderen
 5th Grand Prix de Denain
 5th Grand Prix d'Isbergues
 6th Tour of Flanders
 7th Kampioenschap van Vlaanderen
2004
 2nd Grand Prix d'Isbergues
 4th Overall Circuit Franco-Belge
 5th Cholet-Pays de Loire
 7th Tro-Bro Léon
2006
 1st Paris–Tours
 2nd Overall La Tropicale Amissa Bongo
1st Prologue
 3rd Grand Prix d'Isbergues
 4th Overall Tour du Limousin
 7th Paris–Roubaix
2007
 1st   Overall La Tropicale Amissa Bongo
2008
 1st Tro-Bro Léon
 4th Grand Prix de Denain
 7th Tour de Vendée
 8th Grand Prix d'Isbergues
 9th Grand Prix de Wallonie
2009
 6th Grand Prix de la Somme
 9th GP Ouest–France

References

External links 
Eurosport Profile

1971 births
Living people
French male cyclists
Sportspeople from Ille-et-Vilaine
Cyclists from Brittany